ESTP can refer to:

 One of 16 Myers–Briggs Type Indicators
 A personality type in Socionics
 École Spéciale des Travaux Publics, a graduate school in France